Milland is a village and civil parish in the Chichester district of West Sussex, England. It is situated north of the A272 road on the border with Hampshire.

In the 2001 census the parish covered  and had 332 households with a total population of 829 of whom 394 residents were economically active. At the 2011 Census the population was 891.

The village lies along a section of the Chichester to Silchester Way Roman road, almost the only part to have survived in modern use. At the southern end of the village the boundary banks of a mansio, a Roman posting station on the road, are visible.

The parish has an Anglican church, St. Luke's, the independent Milland Evangelical Church (MEC) and the disused Tuxlith Chapel which is in the care of a national charity the Friends of Friendless Churches.

Hamlets
Hamlets within the civil parish include: Borden to the south, Queens Corner and Titty Hill to the southeast, Wardley and Shufflesheeps to the northeast, Ripsley to the northeast and Great Trippetts to the west.

Employment
Whilst farming and working the land were most important for most people in the past, the Iron and other industries were significant from the Middle Ages.

Estates
There have been several large estates in the village but none dominant.

Dangstein House was the home of Captain James Lyon of the East India Company. In 1851, Reginald Nevill and Lady Dorothy Nevill bought the estate. Lady Dorothy laid out ornamental gardens, a fernery and hothouses.

Famous visitors
Both the Kaiser and Winston Churchill were guests of the Dowager Lady Massereene and Ferrard at Milland Place before the First World War. The Kaiser played racquets despite his withered arm.

References

External links 

Villages in West Sussex
Chichester District